Oink is a 1995 short film directed by Rand Ravich, who later directed The Astronaut's Wife. Oink premiered at the Sundance Film Festival in 1995.

Cast

Stephen Berger as Bert Mittleman
Kathryn Miller as Mrs. Mittleman
Kit Bowen as Desire
Carl Ballantine as The Doctor

References

External links
 

1995 films
1995 short films